Nymphopsis is a genus of sea spiders belonging to the family Ammotheidae.

The genus has almost cosmopolitan distribution, except Europe.

Species:

Nymphopsis abstrusus 
Nymphopsis acinacispinatus 
Nymphopsis anarthra 
Nymphopsis armatus 
Nymphopsis bathursti

References

Pycnogonids
Chelicerate genera
Taxa named by William Aitcheson Haswell